Anthony Watts may refer to:

Anthony Watts (blogger) (born 1958), American broadcast meteorologist and editor of the blog Watts Up With That?
Anthony Watts (rugby league) (born 1986), Australian rugby league player for the Sydney Roosters
 Anthony Watts (biophysicist), British biochemist
Anthony Watts (geologist), British marine geologist and geophysicist